Danielle Fong (born October 30, 1987) is a Canadian scientist and entrepreneur. She was the co-founder and chief scientist of LightSail Energy.

Education
Fong was born in Halifax, Nova Scotia, and was raised in Dartmouth. At age 12, she dropped out of junior high school, and enrolled in Dalhousie University, where she got her Bachelor of Science in Physics and Computer Science in 2005 at age 17. She joined the plasma physics program at Princeton University as a Ph.D candidate, but later dropped out at age 20.

LightSail Energy
In 2009 at Berkeley, California, Fong co-founded LightSail Energy with entrepreneur Stephen Crane and Edwin P. Berlin Jr. LightSail Energy developed a form of compressed air energy storage, which was termed regenerative air energy storage (RAES). The company was initially backed by Khosla Ventures. 

In 2013, Fong stated she wanted to solve an energy problem and help democratize the storage of energy, in order to change how the average person lives in their home.

Nova Scotia's Innovacorp, a government owned enterprise invested in LightSail Energy because of Fong's relationship to the province of Nova Scotia, and it ended up as a large financial loss since LightSail never provided a product or service. In May of 2016, Greentech Media published a highly critical piece on Fong's management of LightSail and alleged untruthful statements to media about the viability of the company's products.

Recognition
In 2011, Fong was featured in Forbes "30 under 30" entrepreneurs under the Energy category. and interviewed by Forbes.com in a video titled "Danielle Fong May Save the World". She was named by the MIT Technology Review as one of the top 35 innovators under 35 in 2012.

She is a regular guest contributor to the Women 2.0 blog and was a featured speaker at the Women 2.0 PITCH Conference & Competition in 2012.

References

1987 births
Living people
Businesspeople from Berkeley, California
Businesspeople from Nova Scotia
Canadian energy industry businesspeople
Canadian expatriates in the United States
Canadian women in business
21st-century Canadian women scientists
Dalhousie University alumni
People from Halifax, Nova Scotia
Princeton University alumni